Gustavo Guadalupe Gutiérrez Muñoz (born 1 November 1996) is a Mexican professional footballer who plays as a goalkeeper for Liga MX club Toluca.

Career statistics

Club

References

External links
 
 
 

Living people
1996 births
Association football goalkeepers
Liga MX players
Deportivo Toluca F.C. players
Footballers from Jalisco
People from Tepatitlán
Mexican footballers